The siege of Surakarta was a military campaign during the Indonesian National Revolution. The Indonesian Republican forces (TNI) briefly infiltrated the city of Surakarta (also known as Solo) before being repulsed by Dutch special forces (RST). Despite the defeat, the battle, together with an earlier attack on Yogyakarta, provided a morale boost for the Indonesians.

Background
From 1945 to 1948, the Dutch re-occupied various regions in Java, the territory of the Republic of Indonesia to Yogyakarta, Surakarta, and surrounding areas. In December 1948, the Dutch attacked and occupied the cities of Yogyakarta and Surakarta and declared that the Republic was destroyed and "no longer existed". In response the Indonesian army led by General Soedirman started a guerrilla war from surrounding areas and conducted large-scale raids into the cities of Yogyakarta and Surakarta, called Serangan Oemoem. The Indonesian troops managed to beat the Dutch troops and occupy both cities for several hours. 

The leader of the raid on Yogyakarta was Lt. Col. Soeharto. Soeharto fled the area in a hurry after heavy fighting. United Nations observers stated that the uprising of the TNI in Yogyakarta had failed and the Dutch were in control again.

The leader of a similar raid on Surakarta on 7 August 1949 was Lt. Col. Slamet Rijadi, who was consolidating with Pakubuwono XII.

Surakarta insurgency
The TNI attempted to capture Surakarta in Central Java before the armistice, and succeeded in many places to infiltrate the city. 325 men of the Regiment Speciale Troepen (RST) were hastily flown in to expel the TNI from Surakarta. In a few days time the insurgency was carried out. Approximately 400 from the Indonesian side were killed, while the Dutch side lost approximately 100 killed.

Aftermath
This last battle of the RST showed again the qualitative superiority of the KST/RST over the Indonesian nationalist fighters.
The leader of the raid on Surakarta on 7 August 1949 was Lt. Col. Slamet Rijadi. To commemorate this event, the main street of the city of Surakarta was renamed "Brigadier General Slamet Rijadi Street".

References

Indonesian National Revolution
Battles of the Indonesian National Revolution
1948 in Indonesia
1949 in Indonesia
August 1949 events in Asia